Royal Festival Hall Vol. 2 is the twenty-fifth album by Klaus Schulze. It was originally released in 1992. This is the fourth of seven early-1990s Klaus Schulze albums not to be reissued by Revisited Records.

Track listing
All tracks composed by Klaus Schulze.

References

External links
 Royal Festival Hall Vol. 2 at the official site of Klaus Schulze
 

Klaus Schulze albums
Albums with cover art by Dave McKean
Albums recorded at the Royal Festival Hall
1992 live albums